Pseudomiza argentilinea is a species of moth of the family Geometridae first described by Frederic Moore in 1868. It is found in Taiwan, China, Myanmar and India.

Subspecies
Pseudomiza argentilinea argentilinea
Pseudomiza argentilinea changi Wang, 1998 (Taiwan)
Pseudomiza argentilinea eugraphes Prout, 1923 (Burma)

References

Moths described in 1868
Ennominae